Skioessa (Greek: Σκιόεσσα, meaning "umbrageous") is a neighbourhood and a settlement in the northeastern part of the city of Patras.  Skioessa had a population of 526 for the settlement.  Skioessa is located 5 km from downtown Patras, about 5 km southeast of Rio, about 37 km west of Aigio and 2 km east of the GR-8/E55 (Athens - Corinth - Patras and Aretha Street. The previous name of this suburb, Voudeni, is still in use.

Nearest places
Charadros, north and northeast
Patras, south and west

Population

Geography
The area are mountainous and hills and has houses and farmlands in the valley areas, grasslands along with bushes and forests are in the mountain areas.  The village has beautiful houses and is next to the Meilichos river.  It has a large football field and a small bridge.

See also
List of settlements in Achaea

References
The first version of the article is translated and is based from the article at the Greek Wikipedia (el:Main Page)

External links
 Skioessa GTP Travel Pages

Neighborhoods in Patras